Wiest Bluff is a prominent bluff in Antarctica, 2,160 m in height, standing just north of the confluence of Shackleton and Zaneveld Glaciers, and marking the west extremity of the Cumulus Hills. Named by Advisory Committee on Antarctic Names (US-ACAN) for William G. Wiest, United States Antarctic Research Program (USARP) ionospheric scientist at the South Pole Station, 1964.

Cliffs of Antarctica
Landforms of the Ross Dependency
Dufek Coast